C. W. Miller Livery Stable is a historic multi-story livery stable located at Buffalo in Erie County, New York.  It is a six-story, rectangular masonry building 65 feet wide and 236 feet deep, built between 1892 and 1894.  As horses were phased out and automobiles became more common, it was converted for use as a parking garage.

Designed by Lansing and Beierl, it was nationally known because of its engineering and other innovations to handle the requirements of horses and wagons, coaches, etc. in a vertical environment.  Originally built with long ramps, in the 1920s it was modified with steeper ramps so that motor vehicles could move more efficiently between floors. When opened, it was proclaimed a "palace for horses."

It was listed on the National Register of Historic Places in 2007.

The site was purchased in 2017 by Buffalo Public Schools for its Emerson School of Hospitality. It plans to work with real estate developer Mark Croce in converting the facility to a culinary school, in partnership with the Curtiss Hotel next door.

References

External links
Miller, C.W., Livery Stable - Buffalo, NY - U.S. National Register of Historic Places, Waymarking.com

Transportation buildings and structures in Buffalo, New York
Agricultural buildings and structures on the National Register of Historic Places in New York (state)
Transport infrastructure completed in 1894
National Register of Historic Places in Buffalo, New York
Stables in the United States